Woodlawn Beach is a census-designated place (as of the 2010 Census) on Santa Rosa Sound in Santa Rosa County, Florida, United States surrounded by the older Midway CDP. It lies south of U.S. Highway 98 between Nantahala Beach Road (CR 191C) and Conover Cove, and includes the Woodlawn Beach Middle School, Woodlawn Beach Boat Ramp, and Gulf Breeze Zoo. Citizens of Woodlawn Beach often consider themselves to be part of the larger communities of Navarre or Gulf Breeze.

References

Census-designated places in Santa Rosa County, Florida
Census-designated places in Florida
Navarre, Florida

Populated places on the Intracoastal Waterway in Florida